Potentilla neumanniana, the spring cinquefoil or spotted cinquefoil, is a perennial flowering plant in the rose family (Rosaceae). It may grow up to the height of 5–15 cm.

It was first scientifically described by H.G.L. Reichenbach in 1832. P.F.A. Ascherson later called it P. tabernaemontani, a name which is now invalid. The name P. verna was misapplied to this species; as originally described by Linnaeus, it actually refers to the alpine cinquefoil (P. crantzii).
This is a fairly nondescript species of cinquefoil. Its typical five-fingered leaves and — in early spring — five-petalled yellow flowers are borne on low-lying stems. As its common name implies, in most of its range it is one of the first cinquefoils to bloom. It can grow in dry, marginal habitat, such as roadsides, dry meadows, and talus. Thus it can be used for rock gardens, providing bright bunches of yellow when few other plants are blooming.

References

External links 

neumanniana
Taxa named by Ludwig Reichenbach